Robbert Huib Kemperman (born 24 June 1990) is a Dutch field hockey player who plays as a midfielder for Hoofdklasse club Amsterdam and the Dutch national team.

International career
At the 2012 Summer Olympics, he competed for the national team in the men's tournament, where he won a silver medal. He made his debut for the national team in 2008, with just 17 years and 111 days of age, he is the second-youngest debutant ever in de Dutch national hockey team.

In 2018, Kemperman played in his third World Cup, where they won the silver medal. Due to his decision to play in the 2019 Malaysia Hockey League, he was not selected for the 2019 Pro League. After the 2019 EuroHockey Championships he returned in the national team for the FIH Olympic Qualifier against Pakistan.

Club career
Born in Nijmegen, he started playing hockey when he was 5 at the local hockey club RKHV Union. In 2005 he went to HC 's-Hertogenbosch where he made his debut for the first team when he was just 15 years old. After his years at 's-Hertogenbosch, he went to Rot-Weiss Köln in Germany in 2010. He played there for two seasons before returning to the Netherlands, where he joined his current club SV Kampong. In 2016 he won the 2015–16 Euro Hockey League with Kampong and then he won two consecutive Dutch national titles in 2017 and 2018. In the winter of 2019, he played in Malaysia for UniKL in the Malaysia Hockey League. In December 2021 it was announced he will leave Kampong after ten seasons and will play for Amsterdam from the summer of 2022 onwards.

Personal life
Kemperman is in a relationship with former Dutch field hockey international Sophie Polkamp.

Honours

Club
Kampong
Euro Hockey League: 2015–16
Hoofdklasse: 2016–17, 2017–18

UniKL
Malaysia Hockey League: 2019

Netherlands
EuroHockey Championship: 2015, 2017, 2021
Hockey World League: 2012–13

References

External links
 

1990 births
Living people
Dutch male field hockey players
Male field hockey midfielders
2010 Men's Hockey World Cup players
Field hockey players at the 2012 Summer Olympics
2014 Men's Hockey World Cup players
Field hockey players at the 2016 Summer Olympics
2018 Men's Hockey World Cup players
Field hockey players at the 2020 Summer Olympics
Olympic field hockey players of the Netherlands
Olympic silver medalists for the Netherlands
Olympic medalists in field hockey
Sportspeople from Nijmegen
Medalists at the 2012 Summer Olympics
SV Kampong players
Rot-Weiss Köln players
HC Den Bosch players
Men's Hoofdklasse Hockey players
Men's Feldhockey Bundesliga players
Amsterdamsche Hockey & Bandy Club players
20th-century Dutch people
21st-century Dutch people